Jean-Jacques Goldman (born 11 October 1951) is a French singer-songwriter and music record producer. He is hugely popular in the French-speaking world. Since the death of Johnny Hallyday in 2017 he has been the highest grossing living French pop rock act. Born in Paris and active in the music scene since 1975, he had a highly successful solo career in the 1980s, and was part of the trio Fredericks Goldman Jones, releasing another string of hits in the 1990s.

He also wrote successful albums and songs for many artists, including D'eux for Céline Dion, which is the most successful French language record to date. He was also part of the Les Enfoirés charity collective from 1986 to 2016, and got his most notable official recognition in the English-speaking world for winning a Grammy Award for Album of the Year in 1997, as a co-author of three tracks on Céline Dion's Falling into You. Despite a voluntary retirement from the music scene in the early 2000s, he remains highly appreciated and influential in France.

Biography 
Born in Paris to an immigrant Polish Jewish father, Alter Mojze Goldman (born in Lublin) and a German Jewish mother, Ruth Ambrunn (born in Munich), Jean-Jacques Goldman was the third of four children. As a child, he began his music studies on the violin, then the piano. In 1968, he abandoned his classical music studies for "American Rock & Roll" as well as folk music, listening to The Beatles, Jimi Hendrix or Aretha Franklin, and emphasizing the guitar. He also earned a business degree from the École des hautes études commerciales du Nord, commonly known as EDHEC, in Lille. In 1972, he met Catherine, his first wife, with whom he had three children. He first entered the French music scene as a member of a progressive rock group named Taï Phong ("great wind", "typhoon" in Vietnamese), which released its first album in 1975. Their first song to be a moderate hit was "Sister Jane". After three albums in English (on which he sang and played guitar as well as violin), Goldman was determined to write and sing in French, which led him to leave the band.

Marc Lumbroso saw his potential and managed to sign him a five-album contract with Epic Records. That same year he released his first album, which he wanted to call Démodé ("old-fashioned", "out of trend"), but the label refused so it was left untitled (although "Démodé" is now its unofficial title). "Il suffira d'un signe" was his first significant success. In 1982, he released a second album with no title – this time the intended title was Minoritaire, which was also refused as it was deemed un-commercial (and has likewise become its unofficial title). It featured several hits: "Quand la musique est bonne", "Comme toi" (inspired by a picture of a young Jewish girl who died in a concentration camp although the heartfelt lyrics never explicitly mention this specific historical context), "Au bout de mes rêves", and was his breakthrough album, with about 900.000 units sold. His third album in 1984, the first with an official title, Positif (chosen as an ironic response to the refusal of the intended "negative" titles of his first two), contained new hits such as "Encore un matin" and "Envole-moi", and performed even better with about 1.000.000 units sold. His fourth album, Non homologué ("not approved", which continued his trend of ironically self-depreciative titles) garnered the hit songs "Je marche seul", 'Je te donne" (a bilingual rock duet with Michael Jones with Jones singing the English verses and Goldman the French ones) and "Pas toi". He recorded a double album in 1987, Entre gris clair et gris foncé ("Between light grey and dark grey"), which launched a string of hits — "Elle a fait un bébé toute seule", "Puisque tu pars", "Là-bas" (a duet with Sirima), "Il changeait la vie" — and was a major success, with more than 2 million units sold.

Yet most critics were harsh, deriding his high-pitched voice, his style and demeanour (described as tame and innocuous) and his soft songs presumably marketed for teenage girls. In reaction, at the end of 1985, he purchased a full page in two major newspapers (Libération and France Soir), displaying excerpts from his harshest reviews, with an ironic message to his fans at the end, again demonstrating his taste for unassuming self-promotion: "Thanks for coming anyway..." ("Merci d'être venus quand même...").

From 1990 to 1995, he went on to perform in a trio called Fredericks / Goldman / Jones with Carole Fredericks (an American singer and chorist who had settled in France in the 1970s, the sister of Taj Mahal) and Michael Jones (a Welsh guitarist and singer who had settled in his mother's native France, whom Goldman knew from Taï Phong—actually he joined the band when Goldman decided to stop touring—and with whom he had a hit in 1985 with "Je te donne"). Together they recorded two studio albums, Fredericks / Goldman / Jones in 1990 and Rouge in 1993 (inspired by the fall of the Berlin Wall and the end of the USSR—the title song features the Red Army Choir), one live album, Du New Morning au Zénith, and released several successful singles, such as "Nuit", "À nos actes manqués", "Né en 17 à Leidenstadt" (another song about war and how it affects people's lives), "Juste après" (inspired by a scene in a TV documentary about the work of Médecins Sans Frontières in Congo showing a missionary sister's harrowing struggle to reanimate a newborn) and "Tu manques". Several of these songs were later re-recorded in English, but did not find much success in England or the United States.

From 1997 to 2003 he returned to performing as a solo act, releasing two albums, En passant in 1997 and Chansons pour les pieds in 2001, as well as two live albums, Tournée 98 En passant and Un tour ensemble, with new hit songs like "On ira", "Quand tu danses", "Sache que je", "Bonne idée", "Tournent les violons", "Ensemble", "Les choses", "Et l'on n'y peut rien". After a last concert in 2004, he suddenly stopped performing and recording, saying he wanted to spend more time with his family (he had remarried in 2001, to a young fan who was then studying mathematics and later got a PhD in pure mathematics). In 2011, to shut down rumors about a possible comeback, he published a short text denying any plan of a new album or tour in the foreseeable future, and remains elusive, largely absent from the media.

He continued to compose and produce a few songs for other artists, though, sometimes lending his voice as part of a collaboration. For example, he recorded "4 Mots sur un piano" with Patrick Fiori and Christine Ricol in 2007; it was a significant hit.

Jean-Jacques Goldman also had a prominent role in French charity acts from the middle of the 1980s, when in 1985 famous comedian Coluche asked him to write a song to promote the initiative he just created, Les restos du coeur, meant to provide food to poor people during the winter months; Goldman crafted and produced the eponymous song (reportedly written/composed in three days), then with Coluche they brought in other French celebrities (actors Yves Montand, Catherine Deneuve and Nathalie Baye, soccer player Michel Platini, TV host Michel Drucker) to perform it as an extended troupe (akin to "We are the world", each singing a verse, or rather reciting, as none of them were trained singers), called Les Enfoirés (originally a very crude and offensive word, literally translatable as "covered in diarrhea", commonly meaning "the bastards" or "the assholes", which was a gimmick of Coluche in his shows and has been somewhat watered down over the years, akin to "motherfucker"). After Coluche's death in 1986, he took over and became the main organizer of the annual charity concert and record, a role he kept fulfilling until 2016, when he decided to quit, after a song he wrote for that year's charity album, "Toute la vie", sparked controversy for its lyrics, which were deemed "reactionary", with an unfair portrayal of current youth and a pointless opposition between "young" and "old" generations.

Throughout his career, Goldman has frequently composed for other singers (sometimes using pseudonyms), most notably Johnny Hallyday (the whole Gang album in 1985, among his most successful) and Céline Dion. He wrote and produced two whole albums for her: D'eux in 1995 (released in the US as The French Album), which is still the best selling French album in history with 10 million copies sold worldwide, and S'il suffisait d'aimer in 1998. He also worked with her on the album 1 fille & 4 types along with Gildas Arzel, Jacques Veneruso and Erick Benzi. The songs "If That's What It Takes", "I Don't Know" and "Fly" from her album Falling into You are English adaptations of songs Goldman wrote for Céline. Also, her song "Let's Talk About Love" from the album of the same name is an English adaptation of Goldman's 1987 solo song "Puisque tu pars". He has also collaborated with Patricia Kaas, Garou, Marc Lavoine, Gérald De Palmas, Patrick Fiori, Khaled ("Aïcha"), Lorie and Florent Pagny, as well as jazzman Chet Baker, Supertramp's saxophonist John Helliwell, Joe Cocker ("On my way home" from the album No Ordinary World is an adaptation from "Là-bas"), "king of soul" Ray Charles and North American songwriter Diane Warren.

On 19 November 2012, Génération Goldman, a tribute album to Goldman, was released on the MyMajorCompany France and M6 Music labels, with a number of artists interpreting Goldman's songs. A second volume followed in 2013.

Personal life
From 1975 to 1997, Goldman was married with Catherine Morlet, a psychologist. He remarried in 2001 with Nathalie Thu Hong-Lagier, a mathematician. He is a father of six: Caroline (b. 1975), Michaël (b. 1979) and Nina (b. 1985) he had with Morlet, and Maya (b. 2004), Kimi (b. 2005) and Rose (b. 2007) he had with Thu Hong-Lagier. His son, Michaël Goldman, is one of the co-founders of My Major Company France, a major fan-funded music label. 

His younger brother Robert Goldman is also a songwriter (often known as J. Kapler).

His half-brother Pierre Goldman, a left-wing intellectual and convicted (though later acquitted) robber, was murdered in mysterious circumstances in 1979 in Paris.

Philanthropy
Goldman was the leader of the Les Enfoirés charity ensemble from 1986 to 2016.

Discography

Solo
 Jean-Jacques Goldman (a.k.a. Démodé) (1981)
 Jean-Jacques Goldman (a.k.a. Minoritaire) (1982)
 Positif (1984) 
 Non homologué (1985)
 Entre gris clair et gris foncé (1987)
 En passant (1997)
 Chansons pour les pieds (2001)

Taï Phong
 Taï Phong (1975)
 Windows (1976)
 Last Flight (1979)

Fredericks Goldman Jones
 Fredericks Goldman Jones (1990)
 Rouge (1993)

References

External links 

  Jean-Jacques Goldman clip/vidéo/live
  Là-bas
 Biography of Jean-Jacques Goldman, from Radio France Internationale
  JJG famille
  Parler d'sa vie
  Autre Part : L'univers des frères Goldman

1951 births
Living people
French people of Polish-Jewish descent
Writers from Paris
20th-century French Jews
Jewish songwriters
Jewish singers
French pop singers
French expatriates in the United Kingdom
Grammy Award winners
20th-century French male singers
21st-century French male singers
French male singer-songwriters